The Donegal county hurling team represents Donegal in hurling and is governed by Donegal GAA, the county board of the Gaelic Athletic Association. The team competes in the Nicky Rackard Cup and the National Hurling League (currently Division 2B, often also in Division 3A).

Donegal's home ground is MacCumhaill Park, Ballybofey. The team's manager is Mickey McCann.

The team last won the Ulster Senior Championship in 1932, but has never won the All-Ireland Senior Championship or the National League.

History
Donegal has three senior and four junior Ulster hurling titles, the last senior win coming in 1932.

Donegal has a residue of pre-GAA hurling. The Burt Hibernians brought Donegal the 1906 Ulster Senior Hurling Championship, defeating Antrim by 25 points to one. Burt later played in Derry. In 1923 Donegal fielded a team of three natives augmented with Gardaí and customs officers from hurling counties to win its second Ulster SHC. When they lined out for the semi-final, wearing blue jerseys against Limerick on a cold, miserable day in Croke Park, numbers were worn by the players for the first time to help the spectators to distinguish them. The team trailed 5–4 to nil at half-time and lost 7–4 to 0–1.

Donegal was National Hurling League Division Three champion in 2001.

Led by Eamon Campbell, Donegal reached the final of the 2006 Nicky Rackard Cup, the first time the team had achieved this, only to be defeated by Derry.

The county reached the final of the 2009 Lory Meagher Cup, only to be defeated by Tyrone.

Donegal won the 2011 Lory Meagher Cup.

Ray Durack was manager of the county team from January 2012 until May 2015. He led Donegal to the 2013 Nicky Rackard Cup. As Nicky Rackard winners, Donegal would have expected to compete in the 2014 Christy Ring Cup. However, due to restructure of the competitions, Donegal were not promoted to the 2014 Christy Ring Cup. Durack then brought the county to Division 2B of the National Hurling League in 2014 (their highest league ranking in team history). Ardal McDermott succeeded Durack as manager, serving between 2015 and 2017 and leading the county back to Division 2B of the National Hurling League in 2017 (as Division 3A champions), after the team were relegated the previous year.

On 25 October 2017, the county board announced Mickey McCann's appointment as senior manager on a two-year contract, with the possibility of a third year in charge also mentioned. The county board had specifically identified him after all candidates nominated for the position were rejected as unsuitable. McCann led Donegal to first competitive victories over Derry and Down in the 2018 National Hurling League. The 2018 Nicky Rackard Cup followed.

Relegation from 2B to 3A followed in 2019, promotion to 2B followed in 2020.

Donegal defeated Mayo in the 2020 Nicky Rackard Cup Final; in doing so, the county became the first to win the competition on three occasions. However, the 2020 win did not secure passage back to the 2021 Christy Ring Cup, a condition that was not made clear until shortly before the final.

Current panel

Recent players include:

2013 captain: Joe Boyle
2014 captain: Joe Boyle

 Declan Coulter
 Danny Cullen (captain until 2020)

 Seán McVeigh (2020 captain); retired after 2022

 Conor Parke

Current management team
As announced on 25 October 2017:

 Manager: Mickey McCann
 Trainer/coach: Gabriel O'Kane
 Another selector yet to be confirmed

 Backroom team: Martin McGrath, Martin Coyle

Managerial history
  1906–200?: ?
  2005: Darren McDermott (player-manager)
 2006–2009: Eamon Campbell
Campbell died on 7 June 2022.
 2010–2011: Andrew Wallace
 2012–2015: Ray Durack
 2015–2017: Ardal McDermott
 2017–present: Mickey McCann

Players

Notable players

All Stars
Nicky Rackard Cup All Star Awards
 2006 – Danny Cullen (Setanta), Aiden Begley (Aodh Ruadh)
 2007 – Ger O'Dwyer (Setanta)
 2008 – Mickey McCann (Burt)
 2012 – Ardal McDermott (Burt), Lee Henderson (Seán MacCumhaills)
 2013 – Christy McDermott (Burt), Danny Cullen (Setanta), Seán McVeigh (St Eunan's), Lee Henderson (Seán MacCumhaills)
 2014 – Justin McGee (Sean MacCumhaills), Paul Sheridan
 2015 – Ronan McDermott (Burt), Jamesie Donnelly (Seán MacCumhaills)
 2016 – Danny Cullen (Setanta), Pádraig Doherty (Burt)
 2018 – Declan Coulter (Setanta), Stephen Gillespie

Lory Meagher Cup All Star Awards
 2009 – Jamesie Donnelly (Seán MacCumhaills)
 2010 – Paul O'Brien (Burt), Mark Patton (Four Masters), Ardal McDermott (Burt)
 2011 – Enda McDermott (Burt), Joe Boyle (Burt), Niall Campbell (Burt), Colm Breathnach (St Eunan's)

Champions 15
 2020 – Danny Cullen (Setanta), Seán McVeigh (St Eunan's)

Nicky Rackard Cup Player of the Year
 2018 – Declan Coulter (Setanta)
 2020 – Danny Cullen (Setanta)

Player of the Year

 2013 Danny Cullen
 2015 Ronan McDermott
 2017 Davin Flynn
 2018 Padraic Doherty (Burt)
 2019 Jack O'Loughlin (Buncrana)

Honours
Official honours, with additions noted.

National
Nicky Rackard Cup
 Winners (3): 2013, 2018, 2020
 Runners-up (3): 2001, 2003, 2006
Lory Meagher Cup
 Winners (1): 2011
 Runners-up (2): 2009, 2010
National Hurling League

 Winners (1): Division 3: 2001
 Winners (1): Division 3A: 2017

Provincial
Ulster Senior Hurling Championship
 Winners (3): 1906, 1923, 1932
 Runners-up (10): 1903, 1910, 1924, 1925, 1929, 1933, 1934, 1937, 1938, 1945 
Ulster Senior Hurling Shield
 Winners (1): 2016
Ulster Junior Hurling Championship
 Winners (6): 1947, 1948, 1972, 1989, 2001, 2003

References

External links
 Matchday programmes released online for games played during the COVID-19 pandemic:
 2020 Nicky Rackard Cup v Longford 
 2020 Nicky Rackard Cup v Armagh 
 2020 Nicky Rackard Cup semi-final 
 2021 NHL Round 1 v Roscommon 
 2021 NHL Round 3 v Mayo 
 2021 Nicky Rackard Cup v Mayo 

 
County hurling teams